Defence Staff may refer to:
 Defence Staff (Denmark)
 Defence Staff (Lithuania)
 Defence Staff (Spain)
 Defence Staff (Sweden)
 Defence Staff (Uruguay)

See also
Chief of the Defence Staff (disambiguation)